Anna Wenzel (born 2 February 1980) is an Austrian former competitive figure skater. She is the 2001 Austrian national champion. She reached the free skate at two ISU Championships: the 1998 Junior Worlds in Saint John, New Brunswick, where she placed 20th; and the 2001 Europeans in Bratislava, where she finished 18th. Her older sister, Marie-Theres Wenzel, also competed internationally for Austria.

Programs

Results
JGP: Junior Series / Junior Grand Prix

References

External links
 
 Tracings.net profile

Navigation

Austrian female single skaters
1980 births
Figure skaters from Vienna
Living people